Christian Miller House is a historic home located at Punxsutawney, Jefferson County, Pennsylvania. It was built about 1870, and is a -story, frame dwelling on a stone foundation in the Italianate-style. It features a slate covered intersecting gable roof, hipped roof front porch, and round- and segmental-arched windows. For many years the house was divided into apartments.

It was added to the National Register of Historic Places in 1995.

References

Houses on the National Register of Historic Places in Pennsylvania
Italianate architecture in Pennsylvania
Houses completed in 1870
Houses in Jefferson County, Pennsylvania
National Register of Historic Places in Jefferson County, Pennsylvania